Raphael Basch, also Rafael Basch (1813, Prague - 22 January 1907, Paris) was a Bohemian-Austrian writer and politician. He was the father of Victor Basch (1863–1944).

At the first disturbances preliminary to the Revolution of 1848, he went to Vienna, and took an active part in the insurrection. Here he founded the Reichstagblatt, which he continued at Kremsier until the dissolution of the Constitutional Assembly, in March, 1849. He then joined the staff of the Oesterreichische Post of Vienna, which he represented at Berlin; subsequently he was the Paris correspondent of several papers. He returned to Vienna in 1855 and assumed the editorship of the Oesterreichische Zeitung, occupying a position of importance as the official mouthpiece of the minister Bruck, the opponent of the clerical minister Bach. After the promulgation of the constitution of 26 February 1861, he acted in a similar capacity to the Schmerling ministry, with which political party he remained connected until its fall.

Until 1875 Basch was engaged only in economic questions, but in that year he returned to political journalism. He represented the Neue Freie Presse at Paris; and in close fellowship with Thiers, Gambetta, and Barthélemy St.-Hilaire he defended the republican policy against the men of 16 May. In 1883 he retired from journalism, but remained in Paris.

Literary works 
He has published a number of political pamphlets;

Two of these, entitled Deutschland, Oesterreich, und Europa, and Oesterreich und das Nationalitätenrecht, Stuttgart, 1870 — which appeared under the pseudonym Ein Altoesterreicher — created on their appearance a great sensation in Austria.

References 
 

1813 births
1907 deaths
Artists from Prague
Politicians from Prague
People from the Kingdom of Bohemia
Czech Jews
Austro-Hungarian Jews
19th-century Austrian people
19th-century Czech people
Austrian male writers
Austrian politicians
Austrian expatriates in France